Alpha Phi Gamma was an Honor Society in the field of Journalism founded in 1919 at Ohio Northern University. It merged with Pi Delta Epsilon to form the Society for Collegiate Journalists in 1975.

History
Alpha Phi Gamma was founded on December 11, 1919, under the name Phi Alpha Gamma. The founders were B. H. Focht, Lloyd W. Reese, R. S. Lyman, Tom B. Haber and Fred C. Slager. In 1923, the group called its first national convention, at which delegates from six other Ohio colleges attended and were granted charters. Also at this meeting, the group changed its name to Alpha Phi Gamma due to another fraternity being called Phi Alpha Gamma and initiated its first female member.

In 1929 the fraternity merged with Omega Xi Alpha, a similar California group, which became Alpha Phi Gamma's western section. After activity came to a standstill during World War II, Gil A. Cowan of the Los Angeles Examiner was responsible for its revival and post war growth. In 1949, Cowan was named President Emeritus, a unique honor to the organization.

In the spring of 1957, Alpha Phi Gamma welcomed Alpha Delta, likewise a journalistic recognition society, in another merger.

Alpha Phi Gamma itself merged with Pi Delta Epsilon to form the Society for Collegiate Journalists in 1975.

Symbols
The Symbols of Alpha Phi Gamma
Badge: A rectangular key with the three Greek letters, Alpha Phi Gamma diagonally from upper left to lower right, three stars in the upper right and an inkwell in the lower left.
Coat of Arms:Three wreath and quill-surmounted inkwells and a secretary bird at the crest
Pledge Emblem:White Bridge Emblem with Alpha Phi Gamma inscribed in black.
Black and White are the society colors
White Carnation is the society flower

Chapters
Chapters of Alpha Phi Gamma:
Alpha - Ohio Northern University
Beta - University of Akron
Gamma - Wilmington College
Delta - Baldwin-Wallace College
Epsilon - Muskingum College
Eta - University of Toledo
Theta - Cotner College
Iota - Louisiana State Normal College
Kappa - New York State Teacher's College, Albany
Lambda - Redlands University
Nu - Southwestern University (Los Angeles)
Omicron - State College of Fresno
Pi - Santa Barbara State Teacher's College
Rho - Hanover College
Sigma - Pennsylvania State Teacher's College - Indiana
Tau - Albion College
Chi - Georgetown College
Psi - College of Puget Sound
Omega - Ball State Teacher's College
Alpha Beta - Gustavus Adolphus College
Alpha Gamma - San Francisco State Teacher's College

Chapters of Alpha Delta in 1957, at the time of the merger into Alpha Phi Gamma:
Illinois Alpha - 1930 - Augustana College (Illinois)
Illinois Beta - 1930 - Bradley University
Illinois Gamma - 1930 - Illinois Wesleyan University (dormant in 1932)
Iowa Alpha - 1930 - Parsons College (dormant in 1931)
Georgia Alpha - 1930 - Brenau University
Illinois Delta - 1933 - Wheaton College (Illinois) (dormant 1950)
Georgia Beta - 1937 - Georgia State Women's College (Valdosta) (dormant in 1941)
Colorado Alpha - 1939 - Colorado State College (now UNC)
Wisconsin Alpha - 1941 - St. Norbert College
Illinois Epsilon - 1941 - Western Illinois University
Illinois Zeta - 1942 - Northern Illinois University
Michigan Alpha - 1947 - Central Michigan University
Illinois Eta - 1949 - Knox College (Illinois)
Oklahoma Alpha - 1950 - East Central University (Oklahoma)
South Dakota Alpha - 1950 - South Dakota School of Mines and Technology
Michigan Beta - 1951 - Ferris State University
Oklahoma Beta - 1951 - Phillips University (Oklahoma) 
Wisconsin Beta - 1951 - University of Wisconsin–Milwaukee
Illinois Theta - 1951 - Illinois State University

Chapters of Pi Delta Epsilon in 1915:
Alpha - pre-1915 - Syracuse University
Beta - pre-1915 - University of Nebraska
Gamma - pre-1915 - Ohio Wesleyan University
Delta - pre-1915 - Massachusetts Institute of Technology
Epsilon - 1915 - Columbia University

Officers

Presidents
The presidents of Alpha Phi Gamma were:

1923-1926 Charles McCorkhill, Ohio Northern University
1926-1927 George McNamara, Ohio Northern University
1927-1928 Ralph L. Ropp, Ohio Northern University
1928-1929 Maxwell P. Boggs, Muskigum University
1929-1930 Richard P. Overmyer, Ohio Northern University
1930-1933 Russell H. Fitzgibbon, Hanover College
1933-1936 John Allan Smith, University of California, Santa Barbara
1937-1939 Richard P. Overmyer, Ohio Northern University
1940-1042 Erwin W. Bischoll, San Francisco State University
1942-1943 Lawrence J. Freeman, Ohio Northern University
1945-1947 Gil A. Cowan, Southwestern College (Los Angeles)
1948 Paul S. Conklin, Hanover College
1949 Gilbert L. Brown, University of Redlands
1950-1951 J. Paul Boushelle, New Mexico State University
1952 Ira G. Hawk, Wilmington College (Ohio)
1953-1954 Paul V. Sheehan, Fresno State University
1954-1955 Lloyd Ritter, Occidental College
1955-1956 Clyde Parker, Sacramento State University
1956-1957 Louis E. Ingelhart, Ball State University
1957-1958 John H. Duke, Fresno State University
1958-1959 Frank S. Basker, Hanover College
1959-1960 Wilfred P. James, California State Univ. at Long Beach
1960-1961 John A. Boyd, Indiana State University
1961-1962 Leo V. Young, San Francisco State University
1962-1964 J. William Click, Central Michigan University
1964-1965 Erling H. Erlandson, California State Univ. at Northridge
1965-1967 Arthur H. Margosian, Fresno State University
1967-1969 Ira L. Baker, High Point College
1969-1971 Marilyn A. Walker, Taylor University
1971-1975 Glen A. W. Kleine, Eastern Kentucky University

Executive Directors
Executive Secretaries of Alpha Phi Gamma:
1927-1934 Sherrill E. Leonard, University of Akron
1934-1935 Terrence H. Ellsworth
1935-1938 Iola Rust, University of Redlands
1945-1946 Frank J. Waters, Southwestern (Los Angeles)
1947-1949 Betty Acheson Mann, Indiana State University
1949-1950 James R. Bash, Indiana State University
1950-1957 Charles L. Brown, University of Redlands
1957-1964 Margaret E. McConnell, Oakland City (Ind.)
1964-1975 J. William Click, Central Michigan University/Ohio University

National Conventions
National Conventions for Alpha Phi Gamma:
1923 — Ohio Northern University, Ada, Ohio
1924 — University of Akron, Akron, Ohio
1926 — Ohio Northern University
1927 — Ohio Northern University
1928 — University of Akron, Ohio
1929 — Hanover College, Hanover, Ind.
1930 — Albion College, Albion, Mich.
1933 — University of California at Santa Barbara
1946 — Indiana State University, Terre Haute, Ind.
1948 — University of Redlands, Redlands, Calif.
1949 — Moorhead State University, Moorhead, Minn.
1954 — Fresno State University, Fresno, Calif.

(After 1954 Alpha Phi Gamma discontinued National Conventions.)

References

Student organizations established in 1919
1919 establishments in Ohio
American journalism organizations
Honor societies